The Litchfield Elementary School District is an elementary school district in Litchfield Park, Arizona and surrounding areas. It was founded in 1915. It has 10 elementary schools and 5 middle schools. It has been serving the area for more than 90 years.

School 16
The Litchfield Elementary School District is planning for the 16th school to come during the 2019-2020 School Year. The information about the 16th school about it being whether it's going to be an elementary school or middle school has yet not been released.

Elementary schools
Barbara B. Robey
Corte Sierra
Dreaming Summit
Litchfield
Mabel Padgett
Palm Valley
Rancho Santa Fe
Scott Libby
Verrado Elementary 
Verrado Heritage

Middle schools
L. Thomas Heck
Verrado Middle 
Western Sky
Wigwam Creek
Verrado Heritage

External links
 Official website

School districts in Arizona
School districts in Maricopa County, Arizona
1915 establishments in Arizona
School districts established in 1915